John Bonar McClelland (born 5 March 1935) is an English former professional footballer who scored 102 goals from 373 games playing in the Football League for Manchester City, Lincoln City, Queens Park Rangers, Portsmouth and Newport County. He played as an outside right.

McClelland was born in Bradford, and began his professional football career with Manchester City. He joined Lincoln City in September 1958, in part exchange for George Hannah, and in his second season was the club's leading scorer with 18 goals. Queens Park Rangers paid £14,000 for his services at the start of the 1961–62 season. He stayed there two years before moving on to Portsmouth for £10,000, where he spent five years before finishing his career with Newport County in 1968–69.

He is married to former sprinter Heather Armitage.

References

1935 births
Living people
Footballers from Bradford
English footballers
Association football wingers
Manchester City F.C. players
Lincoln City F.C. players
Queens Park Rangers F.C. players
Portsmouth F.C. players
Newport County A.F.C. players
English Football League players